Beaver Creek was a children's amusement park inside Blackpool Pleasure Beach. It closed on 5 September 2010 when Managing Director Amanda Thompson announced that it would be working with Nickelodeon to bring the new Nickelodeon Land. Nickelodeon Land opened in Beaver Creek's place on 5 May 2011.

Many of the rides have either been re-themed and put back into place, or moved into a different part of the park and later renamed. For example, Thor's Turnpike was moved to a different place in the park and renamed Alpine Rallye, same with Veteran Carousel, which is now known as Thompson's Carousel.

Rides at Closure

References

Year of establishment missing
2010 disestablishments in England
Blackpool Pleasure Beach